Willem Baudaert or Wilhelmus Baudartius (13 February 1565 in Deinze, Flanders, to 15 December 1640 Zutphen), born Willem Baudart, was a Dutch theologian. Baudartius College, a Christian secondary school in Zutphen, is named after him.

He was the maternal grandfather of Dutch New Netherland colonist and mayor of New York City Wilhelmus Beekman.

Life
Born to Protestant parents in Deinze, Flanders and a fervent counter-remonstrant, Baudartius left the Netherlands on the Duke of Alva's arrival, and landed in England at Sandwich. He studied at Canterbury as well as on the continent at Ghent, Leiden, Franeker, and Heidelberg. He served as a preacher at Kampen (1593), Lisse (1596), and Zutphen (until 1640).

Highly knowledgeable in Hebrew, he was asked to take part in the Statenvertaling translation of the Bible.

Baudartius was a student under David Pareus, a Professor of Theology at Heidelberg University from 1573 until his death. His colleague from 1589 to 1596 was Jacobus Kimmedonck. He had previously studied under Kimmedonck from 1578 till 1584 at Ghent University. Kimmedonck, then minister at Middleburg in Zeeland, introduced him to the Church of Leiden.

In 1585, after the fall of Ghent and Antwerp before the Spanish army under Parma, Baudartius moved to Leiden, in Holland, where his sister Johanna lived.

Works
Baudartius compiled a collection of Christian adages under the title Apophthegmata Christiana, ofte gedenckweerdige, leerzame en aerdige spreucken (1605, 1620), and wrote a pamphlet opposing the Twelve Years' Truce under the title Morghen-Wecker der vrye Nederlantsche provintien (1610).

He also produced a series of illustrations of major events during the first phase of the Eighty Years' War, De Nassausche oorloghen (Amsterdam, 1615).

References

External links

1565 births
1640 deaths
People from Deinze
Dutch Calvinist and Reformed theologians
Translators of the Bible into Dutch
Protestant writers
Dutch members of the Dutch Reformed Church
16th-century Calvinist and Reformed theologians
17th-century Calvinist and Reformed theologians